"Friends" is a song by Canadian singer Justin Bieber and American record producer BloodPop. It was released through Genpop Corporation, RBMG Records, School Boy Records, Def Jam Recordings and Republic Records as a single on August 17, 2017. Bieber and BloodPop wrote the song alongside Justin Tranter and Julia Michaels, with production solely handled by BloodPop. "Friends" peaked at number two on the UK Singles Chart and number 20 on the Billboard Hot 100. On October 20, 2017, Bieber and BloodPop released a remix of the song, which features Michaels.

Background
In July 2017, Bieber played fans a clip of the song at Milan Airport. On August 13, 2017, Bieber first teased the single by tweeting the line: "Can we still be friends". The following day, Bieber announced an upcoming release on social media, the accompanied artwork featured a monochrome illustration of two birds tearing apart a worm in front of highlighter yellow text, captioning: "New music. Thursday noon". Justin Tranter and Julia Michaels later revealed on social media that they co-wrote the single alongside Bieber and BloodPop.

Critical reception
Spencer Kornhaber of The Atlantic called the single "sleek electro" and "the zillionth child of the Eurythmics' "Sweet Dreams (Are Made of This)" to approach the public in the past three decades". He wrote that BloodPop provided "an insistent beat", "a tight verse-prechorus-chorus structure" and "an on-trend wordless hook". Jordan Sargent of Spin thinks that the four songwriters "seem to nod overtly at that song", and that the song "has the same little between-beat drum fills as 'Sorry', as well as its pitched-up vocal counterpoints". Brittany Spanos of Rolling Stone felt that Bieber "traded in the tropical house leanings of his previous solo hits for a more pop direction" with this song. Maeve McDermott of USA Today opined that the song "finally jailbreaks Bieber from the soulless trop-house prison of his other EDM one-offs". Phil Witmer of Vice wrote that the song "pretty much sounds like a synth-disco remix" of "Sorry", in which "the chord progression is the exact same". Beatrice Hazlehurst of Paper called the song "a shameless club banger".

Commercial performance
In Canada, "Friends" charted on the Canadian Hot 100 within a day of release, debuting at number 96 and jumping to number 4 the following week, marking Bieber's 19th top 10 song. It received a double platinum certification from Music Canada for more than 80,000 downloads in the country. In the United States, the song had 16,000 downloads counted only on its release day. The following week, the single debuted at US Adult Contemporary (No. 28), Adult Top 40 (No. 17), Dance Club Songs (No. 42), Mainstream Top 40 (No. 11) and Rhythmic (No. 19). Consequently, it debuted and peaked at No. 20 on the Billboard Hot 100 with 32 million impressions on the radio, 39,000 downloads and 13.3 million streams and being his 23rd Top 20 in the country. It also received a platinum certification by the Recording Industry Association of America (RIAA).

In Europe, the song debuted at the top of the charts in Denmark, Norway and Slovakia, dethroning the remix of "Despacito" by Luis Fonsi and Daddy Yankee, which features Bieber, in the second place of five nationalities, including the United Kingdom, in addition to the top 10 of fourteen. He has received platinum certifications from the Federazione Industria Musicale Italiana (FIMI), gold from the Belgian Entertainment Association (BEA), IFPI Denmark, Bundesverband Musikindustrie (BVMI), Productores de Música de España (PROMUSICAE), the Swedish Recording Industry Association (GLF) and the British Phonographic Industry (BPI). In Oceania, "Friends" reached at number two both in Australia and New Zealand, receiving double platinum certifications from the Australian Recording Industry Association (ARIA) and gold from Recorded Music NZ (RMNZ).

Credits and personnel
Credits adapted from Tidal.
 Justin Bieber – vocals, songwriting
 BloodPop – production, songwriting, keyboard, background vocals, bass, synthesizer
 Julia Michaels – songwriting, background vocals
 Justin Tranter – songwriting
 Josh Gudwin – engineering, recording engineering
 Michael Freeman – mixing assistance
 Spike Stent – mixing

Charts

Weekly charts

Year-end charts

Certifications

Release history

References

2017 songs
2017 singles
Justin Bieber songs
BloodPop songs
Def Jam Recordings singles
Julia Michaels songs
Number-one singles in Denmark
Number-one singles in Norway
Republic Records singles
Schoolboy Records singles
Song recordings produced by BloodPop
Songs written by BloodPop
Songs written by Justin Bieber
Songs written by Julia Michaels
Songs written by Justin Tranter